Walter Gardner Speirs (born 14 April 1963) is a Scottish football manager and former player.

Career

Playing
During his playing career, Speirs played for St Mirren, Kilmarnock (on loan), Dunfermline Athletic (on loan), Hartlepool United, Airdrieonians, Bathgate Thistle and East Stirlingshire.

Managerial
He was on the coaching staff at Clyde, and from 1996 to 1998 held the position of Manager. Subsequently, he joined the coaching staff at Aberdeen, eventually taking the role of assistant manager and in December 2002 was briefly named caretaker manager following the resignation of Ebbe Skovdahl. He worked as caretaker manager of Ross County in October 2005 until the end of the 2005–06 season. He became assistant manager of Partick Thistle in May 2007.

He became manager at Queen's Park after taking over from Billy Stark in 2008. Speirs extended his contract at the end of the 2009–10 season for a further two years, subsequently signing another extension on 27 January 2012 through until 2014.
 He left Queen's Park by mutual consent in December 2013.

Spiers briefly joined the Rangers Academy as a youth coach in March 2015. On 28 August 2015, Gardner joined Lowland League side East Kilbride as assistant manager. He left that position in March 2016.

Having performed the role of Head of Youth Development for Queen's Park for a few years, Speirs was named as caretaker manager of the club on 31 December 2021, following the departure of Laurie Ellis.

Managerial statistics

References

External links

1963 births
Aberdeen F.C. managers
Airdrieonians F.C. (1878) players
Association football midfielders
Bathgate Thistle F.C. players
Clyde F.C. managers
Dunfermline Athletic F.C. players
East Stirlingshire F.C. players
Hartlepool United F.C. players
Kilmarnock F.C. players
Living people
Footballers from Airdrie, North Lanarkshire
Scottish football managers
Scottish footballers
Queen's Park F.C. managers
Ross County F.C. managers
Scottish Football League managers
Scottish Professional Football League managers
Scottish Premier League managers
St Mirren F.C. players
Rangers F.C. non-playing staff
Queen's Park F.C. non-playing staff